

Arthropoda

newly named insects

Archosauromorpha

Newly named dinosaurs
Data courtesy of George Olshevsky's dinosaur genera list.

Pterosaurs

New taxa

Synapsids

Non-mammalian

References

1920s in paleontology
Paleontology
Paleontology 3